A journal, from the Old French journal (meaning "daily"), may refer to:

Bullet journal, a method of personal organization
Personal journal, a record of personal secretive thoughts and as open book to personal therapy or used to feel connected to oneself
Diary, a record of what happened over the course of a day or other period
Daybook, also known as a general journal, a daily record of financial transactions
Logbook, a record of events important to the operation of a vehicle, facility, or otherwise
Transaction log, a chronological record of data processing
Travel journal, a record of the traveller's experience during the course of their journey

In publishing, journal can refer to various periodicals or serials:
Academic journal, an academic or scholarly periodical
Scientific journal, an academic journal focusing on science
Medical journal, an academic journal focusing on medicine
Law review, a professional journal focusing on legal interpretation
Magazine, non-academic or scholarly periodicals in general
Trade magazine, a magazine of interest to those of a particular profession or trade
Literary magazine, a magazine devoted to literature in a broad sense
Newspaper, a periodical covering general news and current events in politics, business, sports and art
Gazette, a type of newspaper, often a newspaper of record
Government gazette, a government newspaper which publishes public or legal notices

Journal may also refer to:

Arts and entertainment
Journal (Canadian TV series), a 1977 Canadian short film television series
Journal (German TV programme), a 1992–2015 German news programme that aired on Deutsche Welle
Journals (album), 2013 album by Justin Bieber 
Journals (Cobain), 2002 collection by Kurt Cobain
Journal, an autobiographical work by Charles Du Bos published from 1946 to 1961

Other uses
Journal (mechanical device), the section of a shaft that turns in a bearing
Journal entry, an accounting transaction in the double-entry bookkeeping system
Journal Peaks, Palmer Land, Antarctica

See also
The Journal (disambiguation), several publications and TV programs that carry this name
List of journals (disambiguation)